The Grand Hour is a 1993 EP by Guided by Voices.  "Shocker in Gloomtown" has remained in GbV concert setlists, and was in 1994 covered by the Breeders.

Track listing
All songs written by Robert Pollard unless otherwise noted.

Side A
 "I'll Get Over It" (Jim Pollard, R. Pollard, Tobin Sprout) – 0:39
 "Shocker in Gloomtown" – 1:25
 "Alien Lanes" (J. Pollard, R. Pollard, Sprout) – 2:32

Side B
 "Off the Floor" (Sprout) – 0:53
 "Break Even" – 2:28
 "Bee Thousand" – 1:30

Personnel 
 Robert Pollard- vocals
 Tobin Sprout- guitar
 Jim Pollard- guitar
 Mitch Mitchell- bass guitar
 Kevin Fennell- drums, percussion

References

1993 EPs
Guided by Voices EPs